Alphonse "Fons" Leweck (born 16 December 1981) is a former Luxembourgian footballer, who last played for FC Erpeldange 72 and was also a member of the Luxembourg national team. He is the elder brother of Charles Leweck and Jim Leweck.

Club career
As a midfielder, Leweck began his career at Young-Boys Diekirch. In 2001, he moved to Etzella Ettelbruck in National Division. Leweck was close to retiring from football after being diagnosed with a serious fault with a heart valve, which cost him a chance to go on a trial with German Bundesliga club Borussia Mönchengladbach.

International career
Leweck made his debut for Luxembourg in a February 2002 friendly match against Albania. After a long departure, Leweck returned to his first match, where he scored the winning goal in the 94th minute against Belarus on 13 October 2007. The goal was the first win for Luxembourg in a UEFA European Championship qualification since 1995. He scored another goal, this time in a 2010 FIFA World Cup qualifier, a 2–1 win over Switzerland. He went on to earn 51 caps, scoring 4 goals.

International goals
Scores and results list Luxembourg's goal tally first.

Personal life
He has two brothers, Charles Leweck and Jim Leweck, who are also footballers, Charles being a midfielder for FC Etzella Ettelbruck.  Fons is also working as a cook in the family hotel.

References

External links
 

1981 births
Living people
Luxembourgian footballers
FC Etzella Ettelbruck players
Luxembourg international footballers
Association football midfielders